The 2018–19 Rwanda Premier League is the 42nd season of the Rwanda Premier League, the top-tier football league in Rwanda. The season started on 19 October 2018.

League table

References

Rwanda National Football League seasons
Premier League
Premier League
Rwanda